William Earl Dodge Scott (April 22, 1852 – August 21, 1910) was an American ornithologist and naturalist.

Biography
Scott was born to Moses Warren Scott and Juliet Ann Cornell. He was the grandson of notable surgeon Joseph Warren Scott. Scott, like his recent ancestors, attended university, first at Cornell University, before transferring to Harvard in Cambridge, Massachusetts to study natural history. While at Harvard, Scott befriended the young group of ornithologists, such as William Brewster, Henry Wetherbee Henshaw, Ruthven Deane, Daniel Chester French, Charles Johnson Maynard, and Henry Augustus Purdie, all of whom founded the first ornithological organization in the country, the Nuttall Ornithological Club. In 1873, he graduated from Harvard, and in 1874, he went to the Penikese Island to study natural history at the Anderson School, which was founded by the recently deceased Louis Agassiz.

After his schooling, Scott briefly headed West for a while, but ultimately returned to New York City and found work as a taxidermist until he was hired as acting curator of the museum of biology at Princeton University in 1875. In 1897, he became curator of the department of ornithology at Princeton. Throughout these years he made several collecting trips across the country and in Jamaica in search of bird specimen for the university.

He died suddenly in 1910 at his home in Saranac Lake, New York.

Select Publications
 Bird Studies (1897)
 Story of  Bird Lover (1902)
 Birds of Patagonia (1903)

References

1852 births
1910 deaths
American ornithologists
American naturalists
Harvard University alumni